Priya is a 1970 Indian Malayalam-language film,  directed by Madhu and produced by N. P. Abu. The film stars Madhu, Sukumari, Jayabharathi and Adoor Bhasi. It is the first directorial venture of actor Madhu, also the Malayalam debut of Mahendra Kapoor and the only Malayalam film of actress Lilly Chakravarthy. The movie won two Kerala State Film Awards for Second Best Film and Best Editor. The film was based on novel Thevidissi by C. Radhakrishnan.

Cast

Madhu
Sukumari
Jayabharathi
Adoor Bhasi
Kottayam Santha
Sankaradi
Ramu Kariyat
Abbas
Bahadoor
Chandraji
Khadeeja
Lily Chakravarty
Meena
Paravoor Bharathan
Philomina
Prema Rao
T. K. Balachandran
Veeran

Soundtrack
The music was composed by M. S. Baburaj with lyrics by Yusufali Kechery.

References

External links
 

1970 films
1970s Malayalam-language films
Films based on Indian novels
1970 directorial debut films